Abid Raza Khan is an Indian politician and a member of the Sixteenth Legislative Assembly of Uttar Pradesh in India. He represents the Badaun constituency of Uttar Pradesh and was a member of the Samajwadi Party political party and considered very close to Azam Khan and Akhilesh Yadav. Recently he joined Indian National Congress.

Early life and  education
Abid Raza Khan was born in Budaun district. He attended the  M. J. P. Rohilkhand University and attained Diploma in Computer Science.

Political career
Abid Raza Khan has been a MLA for one term. He represented the Badaun constituency and is a member of the Samajwadi Party.

He has political relations with big personalities of Samajwadi Party like Azam Khan. Due to some controversy with  M.P. Dharmendra Yadav he left the Samajwadi Party and joined the Indian National Congress.

He lost his seat in the 2017 Uttar Pradesh Assembly election to Mahesh Chandra Gupta of the Bharatiya Janata Party.

Posts held

See also
 Badaun (Assembly constituency)
 Sixteenth Legislative Assembly of Uttar Pradesh
 Uttar Pradesh Legislative Assembly

References 

Samajwadi Party politicians
Uttar Pradesh MLAs 2012–2017
People from Budaun district
1972 births
Living people